War depictions in film and television include documentaries, TV mini-series, and drama serials depicting aspects of historical wars, the films included here are films set in the period from 1775 or at the beginning of the Age of Revolution and until various Empires hit roadblock in 1914,  after lengthy arms race for several years.

American Revolutionary War (1775–1783) 
(Also see American Revolutionary War films, List of films about the American Revolution)

 Betsy Ross (1917)
 The Spirit of '76 (1917)
 America (1924)
 Alexander Hamilton (1931)
 The Pursuit of Happiness (1934)
 Daniel Boone (1936)
 Drums Along the Mohawk (1939)
 The Howards of Virginia (1940)
 Where Do We Go from Here? (1945)
 The Time of Their Lives (1946)
 Sangaree (1953)
 The Scarlet Coat (1955)
 Johnny Tremain (1957)
 The Devil's Disciple (1959)
 John Paul Jones (1959)
 La Fayette (1961)
 1776 (1972), from the musical of the same name
 Valley Forge (1975), made for TV
 The Bastard (1978), made for TV
 The Rebels (1979), made for TV
 The Seekers (1979), made for TV
 George Washington (1984)
 Revolution (1985)
 The Devil's Disciple (1987)
 The Broken Chain (1993)
 The Patriot (2000), depiction of fictional battles with elements similar to the Battle of Camden, Battle of Elizabeth town, Siege of Yorktown, Militia actions and Battle of Cowpens
 The Crossing (2000), A&E film depicting George Washington's crossing of the Delaware River and the Battle of Trenton in 1776
 Benedict Arnold: A Question of Honor (2002), A&E film
 John Adams (2008)
 Turn: Washington's Spies (2014–2017)
 Sons of Liberty (2015)
 Beyond the Mask (2015)

French Revolutionary Wars (1792–1802) 

 A Tale of Two Cities (1917)
 Orphans of the Storm (1921)
 Scaramouche (1923)
 Captain of the Guard (1930)
 The Scarlet Pimpernel (1934)
 A Tale of Two Cities (1935)
 Return of the Scarlet Pimpernel (1937)
 La Marseillaise (film)''' (1938)
 Marie Antoinette (1938)
 New Moon (1940)
 Reign of Terror (1949)
 The Elusive Pimpernel (1950)
 Scaramouche (1952)
 Dangerous Exile (1957)
 A Tale of Two Cities (1958)
 Start the Revolution Without Me (1970)
 A Tale of Two Cities (1980)
 History of the World, Part I (1981)
 The Scarlet Pimpernel (1982)
 Danton (1983)
 Adieu Bonaparte (1985)
 Napoleon and Josephine: A Love Story (1987) (TV miniseries), early segment of miniseries showing Napoleon's Egyptian campaign
 Chouans! (1988)
 Highlander III: The Sorcerer (1994)
 Passion in the Desert (1997)
 War in the Highlands (1999)
 Hornblower (1998–2003 TV series) first six episodes (The Duel, The Fire Ships, The Duchess and the Devil, The Wrong War, Mutiny, Retribution)
 Napoleon (2002) (TV miniseries), early half of first episode showing Napoleon's first Italian campaign and the Battle of Arcole
 The War of the Vendee (2002) a children's movie with an all-youth cast about the 1793 royalist revolt and civil war in the Vendée
 Vaincre ou mourir (2023)
 Napoleon (2023)

 First Barbary War (1801–1805) 
 Old Ironsides (1926), about the USS Constitution
 Tripoli (1950), depiction of the Battle of Derne

 Napoleonic Wars (1803–1815) 

 War and Peace (1915,Russian Empire)
 A Royal Divorce (1926)
 Napoléon (1927), depiction of the Siege of Toulon
 The House of Rothschild (1934), about the rise of the Rothschild family
 The Iron Duke (1934), a biopic of the Duke of Wellington
 Lloyd's of London (1936)
 Conquest (1937)
 A Royal Divorce (1938)
 The Blue Bird (1940)
 Swiss Family Robinson (1940)
 The Rothschilds (1940), German film about the rise of the Rothschild family
 That Hamilton Woman (1941), a biopic of Admiral Horatio Nelson
 The Young Mr. Pitt (1942), a biopic about William Pitt the Younger
 Kolberg (1945), German film about the siege of Kolberg in 1807
 Captain Horatio Hornblower (1951), naval warfare
 War and Peace (1956, USA)
 The Pride and the Passion (1957) napoleonic war film
 Austerlitz (1960), depiction of the Battle of Austerlitz
 Madame Sans-Gêne (1961)
 Hussar Ballad (1962) ("Гусарская баллада" in Russia), musical comedy set in Napoleon's invasion of Russia
 War and Peace (1966–67, USSR) (Война и мир in Russia)
 The Last Battalion (1967) Prussian soldiers fight against rushing Frenchmen
 Waterloo (1970), depiction of the Battle of Waterloo
 The Guerrilla (1973)
 Napoleon and Love (1974) Napoleons relationships with his women as a backdrop to his rise and fall
 The Duellists (1978) Napoleonic war film
 Raffl (1984)
 La Révolution Française (1989)
 Pan Tadeusz (1999)
 Sharpe (1993–2006) (TV series)
 Hornblower (1998–2003 TV series) – last two episodes (Loyalty, Duty)
 The Emperor's New Clothes, adaptation of the novel The Death of Napoleon. A what if tale of Napoleon's exile at St. Helena
 Napoleon (2002) (TV miniseries)
 War and Peace (2002)
 Master and Commander: The Far Side of the World (2003), naval warfare
 Monsieur N (2003), depicts Napoleon's life while imprisoned on St Helena, an investigating British officer later begins to doubt the official story
 The Brothers Grimm (2004), fantasy film about the Brothers Grimm
 Napoleon and Me (2006)
 War and Peace (2007)
 The Ballad of Uhlans (2012)
 Lines of Wellington (2012)
 War & Peace (2016)

War of 1812 

 The Buccaneer (1938)
 Captain Caution (1940)
 Magnificent Doll (1946)
 Last of the Buccaneers (1950)
 Mutiny! (1952), depiction of naval warfare
 The President's Lady (1953)
 The Buccaneer (1958), depiction of the Battle of New Orleans

Arikara War (1823) 
 The Revenant (2015)

Opium Wars: First Opium War (1839–1842) Second Opium War (1856–1860) 
 Ahen senso (1943), First Opium War
 Eternity (1943), First Opium War
 Huo shao yuan ming yuan (The Burning of the Imperial Palace) (1983) (TV miniseries), Second Opium War
 The Opium War (1997), First Opium War

Taiping Rebellion (1850–1864) 
 Noroshi wa Shanghai ni agaru (1944)
 The Warlords (2007)

First Sino-Japanese War (1894–1895) 

 Dugo sa Kapirasong Lupa 血の土地のプロット (1930) – A pre-war Filipino film depicts the Japanese Campaign in Battle of Jiuliancheng, Battle of Lushunkou and the Battle of Pyongyang.
 Empress Myeongseong (2001)
 The Sword with No Name (2009)
 Saka no Ue no Kumo (2009)
 1895 (2009)
 Deng Sichang: The Martyr (2012) – a Chinese film about the Battle between Beiyang Fleet and Imperial Japanese Navy.

Boxer Rebellion (1899–1901) 

 The Marked Woman (D: O.A.C. Lund, USA 1914)
 Foreign Devils ( D: W.S. Van Dyke, USA 1928)
 The Mysterious Dr. Fu Manchu (1929)
 Alarm in Peking (1937)
 55 Days at Peking (1963), depiction of the 1900 Battle of Peking
 Boxer Rebellion (1976)
 Once Upon a Time in China IV (1993)
 The Boxer Rebellion (Gefangen in Peking – Aufstand der Boxer, R: Tilman Remme, DEU 2009) (Doku)

Ottoman wars in Europe (1815-1922 )

Second Serbian Uprising (1815–1817) 
 Vuk Karadžić (1987) (TV series)

Herzegovina uprising (1875–77) 
 Thundering Mountains (1963)

Montenegrin–Ottoman War (1876–78) 
 Marko Miljanov (2000) (TV)

Serbian–Ottoman War (1876–1878) 
 Sve će to narod pozlatiti (1995) (TV)

Russo-Turkish War (1877–1878) 
 Admiral Nakhimov (1947)
 Heroes of Shipka (1955)
 The Turkish Gambit (2005)

Ilinden–Preobrazhenie Uprising (1903) 
 To the Hilt (2014)

Balkan Wars (1912–1913) 
 Balkan Wars 1912–1913 (2016), Turkish documentary available on the official Youtube channel (with English subtitles) .
 Kumanovska bitka (2012), Serbian documentary about the Battle of Kumanovo available on Youtube (in Serbian)

Greco-Turkish War (1919–1922) 

 Ateşten Gömlek (1923)
 You Can't Win 'Em All (1970)
 1922 (1978)
 Kurtulus (1994)
 Stone Mektep (2013)
 The Water Diviner (2014)

Italian unification (1815–1871) 

 1860 (1934)
 Red Shirts (1952)
 Senso (1954)
 Garibaldi (1961)
 The Italian Brigands (1962)
 The Leopard (1963)
 In the Name of the Sovereign People (1990)
 Noi credevamo (2010)

Caucasian War (1817–1864) 
 The White Devil (1930)
 The White Warrior (1959)

Era of Hungarian Betyár (18–19th century) 

 Hajdúk (1974)
 A trombitás (1979)
 Rózsa Sándor (1971)
 Talpuk alatt fütyül a szél (1976)
 Rosszemberek (1979)
 Sárga rózsa (1940)
 Sobri (2002)

Texas War of Independence (1835–1836) 

 The Immortal Alamo (1911)
 Martyrs of the Alamo (1915)
 Davy Crockett at the Fall of the Alamo (1925)
 The Alamo (1936)
 Heroes of the Alamo (1937)
 The Alamo: Shrine of Texas Liberty (1938)
 Man of Conquest (1939)
 The Man from the Alamo (1953)
 Davy Crockett, King of the Wild Frontier (1955)
 The Last Command (1955)
 The First Texan (1956)
 The Alamo (1960)
 The Alamo: Thirteen Days to Glory (1987)
 Texas (1994), television film
 Alamo: The Price of Freedom (1988), IMAX film
 Two for Texas (1998)
 The Alamo (2004), depiction of the siege of the Alamo and ensuing defeat of Santa Anna at Battle of San Jacinto
 Texas Rising (2015)

Mexican–American War (1846–1848) 
 The Cemetery of the Eagles (1939) The battles of Churubusco and Chapultepec were recreated.
 North and South (TV miniseries, 1985–1986), depiction of the Battle of Churubusco
 One Man's Hero (1999), starring Tom Berenger and focusing on the Batallón de San Patricio (Saint Patrick's Battalion) during the American invasion of Mexico
 Ravenous (1999), fictional horror film set against the backdrop of the Mexican–American War.
 The Mexican American War (2006), Description and/or Narration of all Battles Of the Mexican–American War.

Revolutions of 1848 (1848–1849) 
 1848 (1949)
 The Rising Sea (1953)
 A kőszívű ember fiai (1965)
 80 Hussars (1978)
 Flowers of Reverie (1984)
 A komáromi fiú (1987)

Passive Resistance (Hungary) (1849–1867) 
 The Round-Up (1966)
 Élve vagy halva (1980)
 Mathias Sandorf  (1963) French film

Crimean War (1853–1856) 
 The Charge of the Light Brigade (1936), American version directed by Michael Curtiz, depiction of the Battle of Balaclava
 Admiral Nakhimov (1946)
 The Lady with a Lamp (1951)
 Charge of the Lancers (1954)
 The Charge of the Light Brigade (1968), British version directed by Tony Richardson, depiction of the Battle of Balaclava

Eureka Rebellion (1854) 
 Eureka Stockade (1907)
 Eureka Stockade (1949)
 Eureka Stockade (1984), TV miniseries

Indian Rebellion of 1857 and subsequent colonial conflicts in India (1857) 

 Lives of a Bengal Lancer (1935), about suppressing rebellious Indians towards the beginning of the 20th century
 Wee Willie Winkie (1937)
 Gunga Din (1939), suppression of the Thugees and local rebellions
 Anand Math (1952), about the revolt of sanyasis
 King of the Khyber Rifles (1953)
 Bengal Brigade (1954) (Rock Hudson), details the beginning of the mutiny, focusing on a disgraced English Captain and his sepoy troops
 Jhansi Ki Rani (1953) about the 1857 mutiny
 The Brigand of Kandahar (1965)
 Kranti, drama about the 1857 war of independence
 Junoon (1979) about the 1857 mutiny
 Shatranj Ke Khilari (1977) about the 1857 mutiny
 Swaraj (1998) A DD TV Series on Indian struggle of independence
 Mangal Pandey: The Rising (2005), about the 1857 mutiny
 Victoria & Abdul (2017)

American Civil War (1861–1865) 

(Also see American Civil War films, Cinema and television about the American Civil War)
 The Birth of a Nation (1915), first English Language epic film
 The Copperhead (1920)
 The General (1926), a comedy starring Buster Keaton
 Abraham Lincoln (1930)
 The Littlest Rebel (1935)
 General Spanky (1936)
 Gone with the Wind (1939)
 Virginia City (1940)
 A Southern Yankee (1948)
 The Red Badge of Courage (1951)
 Friendly Persuasion (1956)
 Band of Angels (1957)
 The Horse Soldiers (1959), depiction of Grierson's Raid
 How the West Was Won (1962)
 Major Dundee (1965)
 Shenandoah (1965)
 Alvarez Kelly (1966)
 The Good, the Bad and the Ugly (1966)
 A Time for Killing (1967)
 Rio Lobo (1970)
 The Beguiled (1971)
 The Outlaw Josey Wales (1976), Missouri guerilla goes on the run in 1865
 The Blue and the Gray (TV miniseries, 1982)
 North and South (TV miniseries, 1985–86) – Book II episodes, depictions of the battles of Bull Run I, Antietam, Wilderness and Petersburg III
 Lincoln (TV miniseries, 1988)
 Glory (1989), depictions of the Battle of Antietam, the Battle of Grimball's Landing, and the Second Battle of Fort Wagner
 Dances with Wolves (1990)
 Ironclads (1991), made for TV
 Gettysburg (1993), depiction of the Battle of Gettysburg
 Class of '61 (1993), made for TV
 Pharaoh's Army (1995), a Union mounted infantry patrol in Kentucky
 Andersonville (1996), made for TV, Union POWs in Andersonville Prison Camp
 The Hunley (1999), made for TV, depiction of the Confederate submarine in Charleston Harbor
 Ride with the Devil (1999)
 Gangs of New York (2002)
 Gods and Generals (2003), depictions of the First Battle of Bull Run, the Battle of Antietam, the Battle of Fredericksburg, and the Battle of Chancellorsville.
 Wicked Spring (2003), the Battle of the Wilderness
 Cold Mountain (2003), depiction of the Battle of the Crater
 Abraham Lincoln: Vampire Hunter (2012)
 Lincoln (2012)
 Saving Lincoln (2013)
 Army of Frankensteins (2014)
 Field of Lost Shoes (2014)
 Free State of Jones (2016)

Franco-Mexican War (1861–1867) 

 Juarez (1939)
 The Eagle and the Hawk (1950)
 Stronghold (1951)
 Vera Cruz (1954)
 Major Dundee (1965)
 The Undefeated (1969)
 Two Mules for Sister Sara (1970)
 Cinco de Mayo, La Batalla (2013)

Paraguayan War (1864–1870) 
 Argentino hasta la muerte (1971)
 Cerro Cora (1978)
 Netto perde sua alma (2001)

Second Schleswig War (1864) 
 Bismarck (1940)
 1864 (2014), TV series

Boshin War (1868–1869) 
 Goryōkaku (1988 drama) (1988) Battle of Hakodate
 When the Last Sword Is Drawn (2002) Shinsengumi
 Shinsengumi! (2004) TVseries 
 Byakkotai (2007 drama) (2007) TV drama Battle of Toba–Fushimi, Battle of Aizu

Franco-Prussian War (1870–1871) 
 Bismarck (1940)
 Mademoiselle Fifi (1944)
 A Day Will Come (1950)
 Die Gans von Sedan (1959)
 Field of Honor (1987) In French: Champ d'honneur

Satsuma Rebellion (1877) 
 The Last Samurai (2003)

Scramble for Africa (1879–1914)

Anglo-Zulu War (1879) 
 Zulu (1964), depiction of the Battle of Rorke's Drift
 Zulu Dawn (1979), depiction of the Battle of Isandlwana
 Shaka Zulu (1986)

First Boer War (1880–1881) 
 Majuba (a.k.a. Hill of Doves) (1968)

Colonial conflicts in Northern Africa (1880s–1931) 

 Beau Geste (1926), starring Ronald Colman
 Beau Ideal (1931)
 Beau Geste (1939), featuring Gary Cooper
 Beau Geste (1966), with Guy Stockwell
 The Wind and the Lion (1975), Ion Perdicaris
 March or Die (1977), Rif War
 Lion of the Desert (1981), Italian attempt to colonialize southern Libya
 Legionnaire (1998), Rif War

Mahdist Sudanese War (1881–1899) 

 The Four Feathers (1921)
 The Four Feathers (1929)
 The Four Feathers (1939)
 Storm Over the Nile (1955)
 Khartoum (1966), depiction of the Battle of Khartoum
 Young Winston (1972), depiction of the Battle of Omdurman
 The Four Feathers (1978)
 The Four Feathers (2002)

First Matabele War (1893–1894) 
 Major Wilson's Last Stand (1899)
 Shangani Patrol (1970)

First Italo-Ethiopian War (1895–1896) 
 Abuna Messias (1939)
 Adwa (1999)

Second Boer War (1899–1902) 

 Cavalcade (1933)
 The Little Princess (1939)
 Ohm Kruger (1941)
 The Life and Death of Colonel Blimp (1943)
 Untamed (1955)
 Strangers at Sunrise (1969)
 Young Winston (1972)
 Breaker Morant (1980)
 Torn Allegiance (1984)
 Blood & Glory (2016)

Timok Rebellion (1883) 
 Timočka buna (1983)

Serbo-Bulgarian War (1885) 
 Arms and the Man (1958)

Cuban War of Independence (1895–1898) 
 Santiago (1956)

Philippine Revolution (1896–1898) 

 Last Stand in the Philippines (1945)
 Dugo ng Katipunan (1949)
 Ang Buhay at Pag Ibig ni Dr. Jose Rizal (1956)
 Alyas Sakay (1961)
 El Filibusterismo (1962)
 Andres Bonifacio: Ang Supremo (1963)
 Elias, Basilio at Sisa (1972)
 Dugo at Pag Ibig sa Kapirasong Lupa (1975)
 Aguila (1980)
 José Rizal (1998)
 Bayaning Pilipino (2000)
 Emilio Aguinaldo (2000)
 Diwa (2002)
 El Presidente (2012)
 Supremo (2012)
 Bonifacio: Ang Unang Pangulo (2014)
 A Lullaby to the Sorrowful Mystery (2016)
 1898: Los últimos de Filipinas (2016)

Spanish–American War (1898) 

 I Loved a Woman (1933)
 The Bowery (1933)
 A Message to Garcia (1936)
 Texas Trail (1937)
 Yellow Jack (1938)
 Mother Carey's Chickens (1938)
 Teddy, the Rough Rider (1940)
 Citizen Kane (1941)
 Pursued (1947)
 Stars and Stripes Forever (1952)

 The Rough Riders (1997)

Philippine–American War (1899–1902/1913) 

 Philippino War Dance (1903)
 Sakay (1937)
 The Real Glory (1939)
 Hen. Gregorio del Pilar – Bayani sa Pasong Tirad (1949)
 Cavalry Command (1963)
 This Bloody Blundering Business (1975)
 Juramentado (1983)
 Sakay (1993)
 Tirad Pass: The Story of Gen. Gregorio del Pilar (1997)
 Diwa (2002)
 Amigo (2010), American troops occupy a Philippine village
 El Presidente (2012)
 Heneral Luna (2015)
 Goyo: Ang Batang Heneral (2018)

Russo-Japanese War (1904–1905) 

 The Battle (1934)
 Jack London (1943)
 Cruiser 'Varyag' (1946)
 Nichiro sensô shôri no hishi: Tekichû ôdan sanbyaku-ri (1957)
 Meiji tennô to nichiro daisenso (1958)
 Battle of the Japan Sea (1969)
 The Battle of Tsushima (1975) [documentary], depiction of the naval Battle of Tsushima
 The Battle of Port Arthur (1980)
 Nihonkai daikaisen: Umi yukaba (1983)
 Lime-iro Senkitan (2003)
 Bogatstvo (2004)
 Saka no Ue no Kumo (2009) Japanese TV series
 The Prisoner of Sakura (2019)

Xinhai Revolution (1911–1912) 
 The Battle for the Republic of China (1981)
 1911 (2011)
 The Founding of a Party (2011) Depicts Chinese revolutionary violence and political intrigue leading to the founding of the Chinese Communist Party in 1921

See also 
 List of war films and TV specials

References